Mizdej-e Olya Rural District is in the Central District of Farsan County, Chaharmahal and Bakhtiari province, Iran. At the census of 2006, its population was 14,366 in 3,173 households; there were 10,893 inhabitants in 2,848 households at the following census of 2011; and in the most recent census of 2016, the population of the rural district was 4,810 in 1,312 households. The largest of its three villages was Deh Cheshmeh, with 4,510 people.

References 

Farsan County

Rural Districts of Chaharmahal and Bakhtiari Province

Populated places in Chaharmahal and Bakhtiari Province

Populated places in Farsan County